PP-146 Lahore-III is a Constituency of the Provincial Assembly of Punjab.

See also
 PP-145 Lahore-II
 PP-147 Lahore-IV

References

External links
 Election commission Pakistan's official website
 Awazoday.com check result
 Official Website of Government of Punjab

Constituencies of Punjab, Pakistan